Balbura is a genus of moths in the subfamily Arctiinae.

Species
 Balbura dorsisigna Walker 1854
 Balbura fasciata
 Balbura fresini
 Balbura intervenata

References
Natural History Museum Lepidoptera generic names catalog

Lithosiini
Moth genera